In enzymology, a 3-methylbutanal reductase is an enzyme that catalyzes the chemical reaction

3-methylbutan-1-ol + NAD(P)+  3-methylbutanal + NAD(P)H + H+

The three substrates of this enzyme are 3-methylbutan-1-ol (isoamyl alcohol), NAD+, and NADP+, whereas its four products are 3-methylbutanal, NADH, NADPH, and H+.

This enzyme belongs to the family of oxidoreductases, specifically those acting on the CH-OH group of donor with NAD+ or NADP+ as acceptor. The systematic name of this enzyme class is 3-methylbutanol:NAD(P)+ oxidoreductase.

References

 
 

EC 1.1.1
NADPH-dependent enzymes
NADH-dependent enzymes
Enzymes of unknown structure